The 1983 Munster Senior Hurling Championship Final was a hurling match played on Sunday 10 July at the Gaelic Grounds in Limerick. It was contested by Cork and Waterford. Cork captained by Jimmy Barry-Murphy claimed the title beating Waterford on a scoreline of 3-22 to 0-12.

References

External links
Match Programme

Munster
Munster Senior Hurling Championship Finals
Cork county hurling team matches
Waterford GAA matches